Byron P. Howard (born December 26, 1968) is an American animator, character designer, story artist, film director, film producer, and screenwriter. He is best known as the director of the Walt Disney Animation Studios films Bolt (2008), Tangled (2010), Zootopia (2016), and Encanto (2021). He is the first LGBT director to win the Oscar for Best Animated Feature twice for his work of Zootopia and Encanto.

Early life and education
Howard was born in Misawa, Japan, and raised in both the outskirts of Philadelphia and Issaquah, Washington, United States, in a middle-class family. He attended Evergreen State College in Olympia, Washington.

Career

Howard began his career at Disney as a tour guide at Disney MGM Studios. Howard had dreamed of working for Disney, and had written to Master Animator Frank Thomas, one of Disney's Nine Old Men, as he was growing up. He soon began the Disney Studio Internship and was hired in 1994, working as an animator on films including Pocahontas, Mulan, Lilo & Stitch and Brother Bear. He was nominated for a 2003 Annie Award for Character Animation for Brother Bear.

The first film Howard directed was the animated Disney film Bolt, which was nominated for the 2008 Academy Award for Best Animated Feature. In his role as co-director of the film with Chris Williams, Howard focused on character design and animation. Howard went on to direct the animated Disney films Tangled (2010, co-directed with Nathan Greno) and Zootopia (2016, co-directed with Rich Moore). He and Greno also co-directed and wrote the animated short Tangled Ever After, which features supporting characters from Tangled and showed in theaters before the 2012 3D re-release of Beauty and the Beast.

After Zootopia, Howard worked with Lin-Manuel Miranda on Encanto. Howard co-directed the film, alongside Zootopia co-director Jared Bush and Charise Castro Smith, while Miranda wrote songs for the project, which centered on a girl from a magical Colombian family who lacks magic herself.

In 2009, Howard became a member of the Academy of Motion Picture Arts & Sciences.

Personal life
In the Fusion documentary Imagining Zootopia, Howard mentioned he is openly gay and has been married since 1988.

Filmography

Feature films

Short films

Awards
Golden Globe Award
 2008 – Nominated: Golden Globe Award for Best Animated Feature Film for Bolt
 2010 – Nominated: Golden Globe Award for Best Animated Feature Film for Tangled
 2017 – Won: Golden Globe Award for Best Animated Feature Film for Zootopia
 2021 – Won: Golden Globe Award for Best Animated Feature Film for Encanto

Academy Award
 2008 – Nominated: Academy Award for Best Animated Feature for Bolt
 2017 – Won: Academy Award for Best Animated Feature for Zootopia
 2021 – Won: Academy Award for Best Animated Feature forEncanto

See also
 List of LGBT Academy Award winners and nominees

References

External links

 

1968 births
American animators
American film directors
Living people
Walt Disney Animation Studios people
LGBT animators
American animated film directors
American gay writers
American LGBT screenwriters
American male screenwriters
American male voice actors
Evergreen State College alumni
Directors of Best Animated Feature Academy Award winners
Artists from Aomori Prefecture
LGBT film directors